The 2015 Patriot League men's soccer tournament was the 26th edition of the tournament. It determined the Patriot League's automatic berth into the 2015 NCAA Division I Men's Soccer Championship.

Lehigh won the tournament, besting the American in the championship match.

Qualification 

The top six teams in the Patriot League based on their conference regular season records qualified for the tournament.

Bracket

Schedule

Quarterfinals

Semifinals

Championship

Statistical leaders

Top goalscorers

Tournament Best XI 

 Jamie Luchini (MVP), Lehigh
 Justin Worley, Lehigh
 Danny Gonzalez, Lehigh
 Joe Bogan, Lehigh
 Dylan Hobert, American
 Jordan Manley, American
 Jake Garcia, American
 David Asbjornsson, Boston University
 Danny Foen, Boston University
 Colin O'Neill, Colgate
 Zach Tamen, Colgate

See also 
 Patriot League
 2015 Patriot League men's soccer season
 2015 NCAA Division I men's soccer season
 2015 NCAA Division I Men's Soccer Championship

References 

tournament 2015
Patriot League Men's Soccer
Patriot League Men's Soccer
Patriot League Men's Soccer